VPS Healthcare is a multinational healthcare group headquartered at Abu Dhabi, United Arab Emirates. The group was founded in 2007 by Indian-born businessman Shamsheer Vayalil. The healthcare group now runs 23 hospitals and about 125 medical centres spread across in the Middle East, Europe and India.

Hospitals
VPS Healthcare was founded and established in 2007 at Abu Dhabi, the United Arab Emirates by Dr. Shamsheer Vayalil, a doctor-turned entrepreneur.  The first hospital to be opened by the group was LLH Hospital in Abu Dhabi, UAE, in 2007. As of 2019, VPS Healthcare owns 22 hospitals which are operational in UAE, Oman and India:
 LLH Hospital – Abu Dhabi (2007)
 LLH Hospital – Mussaffa (2008)
 Lifeline Hospital, Sohar, Oman (2011)
 Life Care Hospital, Baniyas, Abu Dhabi (2012)
 Burjeel Hospital, Abu Dhabi (2012)
 Burjeel Hospital for Advanced Surgery, Dubai (2013)
 Life Care Hospital, Musaffah, Abu Dhabi (2014)
 Tajmeel Kids Park Medical Centre, Abu Dhabi (2014)
 Medeor Hospital, Abu Dhabi (2015)
 Medeor Hospital, Dubai (2015)
 Burjeel Hospital, Muscat, Oman (2016)
 Medeor Hospitals, Delhi NCR, India (2016)
 Medeor International Hospital, Al Ain, UAE (2016)
 OccuMed Clinic, Abu Dhabi (2016)
 Tajmeel Specialised Medical Centre, Abu Dhabi (2016)
 Educare Institute of Dental Sciences, Kerala, India (2016)
 Burjeel Day Surgery Centre, Abu Dhabi (2017)
 Burjeel Royal Hospital, Al Ain, UAE (2018)
 Burjeel Specialty Hospital, Sharjah (2019)
 Burjeel Medical city (Abu Dhabi) 2020
 Burjeel Retail Pharmacies (Abu Dhabi)

Response Plus Medical
In 2010, VPS Healthcare launched Response Plus Medical services in Abu Dhabi. Response Plus Medical services cater to the needs of the people in their worksite.  It also provides medical support for sport and entertainment events, coordinating specialised medical and ambulance services.

Pharmaceutical production

LIFE Pharma  is the pharmaceutical manufacturing arm of VPS Healthcare, approved by both US FDA and the European Authorities.

References

Health care companies of the United Arab Emirates
Health care companies established in 2007
Emirati companies established in 2007
Companies based in Abu Dhabi